Abárzuza is a town and municipality located in the province and autonomous community of Navarre, northern Spain.

References

External links
 

Municipalities in Navarre